Santosham Film Awards, currently known as Santosham South Indian Film Awards are one of the most popular awards given for Tollywood films and Telugu Music Artistes.

Background
The awards first began in 2004 by the annual Santosham magazine which was started in 2003. The awards felicitate all of the technicians and actors for their contribution to Tollywood and Telugu Music Industry.

Popular awards
 Best Film
 Best Director
 Best Producer
 Best Actor 	
 Best Actress 	 	
 Best Supporting Actor
 Best Supporting Actress
 Best Villain 
 Best Young Performers
 Best Comedian 	
 Best Music Director 	
Best Character Actor
 Best Lyricist
 Best Male Playback Singer
 Best Female Playback Singer

Technical Awards
 Best Art Direction
 Best Action
 Best Cinematographer
 Best Editing
 Best Choreography
 Best Story
 Best Screenplay
 Best Dialogue 	
 Best Sound Recording

Ceremonies 

 21st Santosham Film Awards
 20th Santosham Film Awards (replaced 18th and 19th ceremonies)
17th Santosham Film Awards
16th Santosham Film Awards
15th Santosham Film Awards
14th Santosham Film Awards

 
Awards established in 2004
Telugu film awards
2004 establishments in Andhra Pradesh
Andhra Pradesh awards